The Stanton Formation is a geologic formation of limestone in Iowa, Nebraska, Missouri and Kansas. It preserves fossils dating back to the Carboniferous period. It is in the Upper Pennsylvanian series, forming the top of the Lansing Group.

Location 
The Stanton Formation overlies and underlies the Vilas Shale and the Weston Shale Member of the Stranger Formation respectively. The Stanton Limestone outcrop is found between the Platte River Valley of eastern Nebraska to the Oklahoma border, traversing through Iowa, Missouri and eastern Kansas.

See also 

 List of fossiliferous stratigraphic units in Iowa
 List of fossiliferous stratigraphic units in Kansas
 List of fossiliferous stratigraphic units in Missouri
 List of fossiliferous stratigraphic units in Nebraska
 Paleontology in Iowa
 Paleontology in Kansas
 Paleontology in Missouri
 Paleontology in Nebraska

References

Further reading 

 R. K. Pabian and W. J. Rushlau. 2002. Taphonomic Analysis and Systematic Descriptions of Some Late Pennsylvanian and Early Permian Crinoids from Southeastern Nebraska, Eastern Kansas and Southwestern Iowa. Geological Survey Papers 20
 J. M. Malinky and P. H. Heckel. 1998. Paleoecology and taphonomy of faunal assemblages in gray "core" (offshore) shales in Midcontinent Pennsylvanian cyclothems. Palaios 13(4):311-334
 P. F. Holterhoff. 1997. Filtration models, guilds, and biofacies: crinoid paleoecology of the Stanton Formation (Upper Pennsylvanian), Midcontinent, North America. Palaeogeography, Palaeoclimatology, Palaeoecology 130(1-4):177-208
 R. B. Winston. 1983. A Late Pennsylvanian upland flora in Kansas: Systematics and environmental implications. Rev. Palaeobotany. Palynol. 40:5-31
 R. K. Pabian and J. A. Fagerstrom. 1972. Late Paleozoic trilobites from southeastern Nebraska. Journal of Paleontology 46(6):789-816
 R. M. Jeffords. 1947. Pennsylvanian lophophyllidid corals. University of Kansas Paleontological Contributions, Coelenterata 1:1-84
 B. Kellett. 1935. Ostracodes of the Upper Pennsylvanian and the Lower Permian strata of Kanss: III. Bairdiidae (concluded), Cytherellidae, Cypridinidae, Entomoconchidae, Cytheridae, and Cypridae. Journal of Paleontology 9(2):132-166
 N. D. Newell. 1935. Some Mid-Pennsylvanian invertebrates from Kansas and Oklahoma. II. Stromatoporoidea, Anthozoa, and Gastropoda. Journal of Paleontology 9(3):341-355

Carboniferous Iowa
Carboniferous Kansas
Carboniferous Missouri
Carboniferous geology of Nebraska
Carboniferous geology of Oklahoma
Carboniferous southern paleotropical deposits
Limestone formations
Shale formations of the United States
Reef deposits
Shallow marine deposits
Open marine deposits
Paleontology in Iowa
Paleontology in Kansas
Paleontology in Nebraska